Graspop Metal Meeting is a Belgian heavy metal festival held in Dessel each year since 1996, excluding 2020 and 2021 due to covid restrictions. Despite the small size of the festival grounds (upholding a perimeter of only ~4 km) the festival draws a large number of spectators from around Europe, with a total of 220,000 visitors in 2022, up from 200,000 visitors over the course of the 2019 edition, and 152,000 in 2015.

History
Graspop was not originally a heavy metal festival; rather, it was conceived as a local family rock festival, first organised in 1986. In 1995, the headliners were Joe Cocker and Simple Minds. However, due to the public being oversaturated with family festivals, the number of visitors had dropped to an all-time low.

Founder Peter Van Geel realized that mainstream rock music held insufficient appeal to festival visitors. Reflecting on the most memorable acts of the preceding years (Motörhead, Ramones, Paradise Lost, and so forth) and on his own musical preferences, he decided in favour of a drastic reorientation.

After discussions with Werchter festival promoter Herman Schueremans, Van Geel contacted Bob Schoenmaekers, the owner of the Biebob concert venue and metal club in nearby Vosselaar. A couple of years earlier, Schoenmaekers had set up his "Midsummer Metal Meeting" in Vosselaar and because of space limits, he was considering an open-air festival. The initial contact soon led to close collaboration. The duo decided to launch a brand-new metal festival under the name of "Graspop Metal Meeting". The date of choice was to be the last weekend of June.

The new direction proved to be a successful one. The festival has seen a continually rising number of visitors over the years, and has been able to attract the most popular international bands in the genre. Since the festival's inception in 1996, Iron Maiden has been the most frequent headliner with 10 appearances. Other bands which have prominently been featured are Hatebreed (9), Saxon (9), Sick of it All (9), Slayer (9), Cradle Of Filth (8), Epica (8), In Flames (8), Moonspell (8), My Dying Bride (8) and Within Temptation (8).

The current stages are :
 Main Stage 1 & 2 : The two main stages, host important bands and headlining acts. Before 2014, there was only one main stage.
 Marquee : A tent stage, which hosts mostly thrash metal, death metal, black metal or even stoner rock bands.
 Metal Dome : Host more intimist bands and local acts.
 Jupiler Stage : First held in 2014, it is a small open air stage, mostly dedicated to metalcore, hardcore and deathcore music.

Location

The festival is located in Kastelsedijk, in Dessel and is situated about 60 km away from Antwerp, 99 km from Brussels and 35 km from Eindhoven in the Netherlands.

Dessel is a municipality with 9103 inhabitants in the province of Antwerp in Belgium. The 27.03 km ² comprehensive community lies in the Flemish Region, also known as Flanders, this is the officially Dutch-speaking part of Belgium. The distance to the neighboring country, the Netherlands, is less than 10 km. The largest part of the economy of Dessel is determined by different regions of the nuclear power industry. Dessel is the twin town of Hesse-Lichtenau.

Tickets
Combination tickets for the Graspop Metal Meeting include camping from Thursday to Monday, parking for a vehicle (until 2022) and entry to the festival site. Day tickets are available, and before 2013 they did not include camping; camping tickets could be purchased separately. Camping tickets allowed day ticket holders to spend the night on the camping site. A camping ticket was valid on the same day as the festival ticket. From 2013 onwards, a day ticket included admission to the campsite.

In 2009 Graspop Metal Meeting introduced a VIP ticket. The VIP package consists of: parking space in the VIP car park; which is nearer the festival ground, access to the VIP lounge, and separate entrances to the campsite and the festival arena.

Accommodation
Most people who stay at Graspop Metal Meeting will camp in a tent. Campsite accommodation is provided in the cost of a combi ticket but festival-goers must bring their own tents.

Caravans and trailer tents are not allowed onto the camp site. However attendees can book a pitch in addition to the main ticket which allows access to Graspop Metal Town.

Graspop Metal Town
Graspop Metal Town is located at just 1 km from the festival site and is a veritable open air hotel with its proper sanitary facilities, breakfast tent, bar and reception desk. Attendees can either spend the night in a Festihut or can book a pitch for their motorhome, caravan or tent.

Festihuts
Introduced in 2008 the Festihut is a wooden cottage equipped with beds or bunk beds and mattresses.

Festihut details:
Four people per Festihut, equipped with (bunk) beds and mattresses
Dimensions: 3 m x 2.5 m (7.5 m²)
Lockable door and insulated roof
One window as a minimum
Wooden floor at least 10 cm above the ground
1 rechargeable lantern per hut (to be charged at the reception desk)
All huts have electricity (max. 300W)
Guests must bring their own sheets
Smoking inside the Festihut is prohibited

Pitches
Metal Town has space for 250 standard pitches and 50 XL pitches, for people who want to bring a caravan, mobile home, or tent.

Pitch details:
1 pitch = max. 6 persons
 Pitch standard: 8m x 4m / pitch XL: 12m x 4m
 Every pitch has electricity (max. 300W). Electricity will be available but attendees still need to bring their own extension leads.
 (Folding) caravan owners must return their car to the car park after leaving their caravan at the pitch.
Each pitch is rented for 4 nights.
Owners who leave their vehicle behind will be fined €500/vehicle.
 Cars are not allowed to park next to the Festihut or pitch. Guests must return their car to the car park after leaving their belongings in the Festihut or at the pitch (except for mobile homes).

Graspop Metal Meeting 1996

Helloween was announced, but had to cancel and were replaced by Skin

Graspop Metal Meeting 1997

My Dying Bride was announced as headliner in the Marquee but they had to cancel because of the illness of their drummer.
Obituary was replaced by Napalm Death.

Graspop Metal Meeting 1998

Graspop Metal Meeting 1999

Graspop Metal Meeting 2000

Graspop Metal Meeting 2001

Graspop Metal Meeting 2002

Graspop Metal Meeting 2003

Graspop Metal Meeting 2004

Graspop Metal Meeting 2005

Graspop Metal Meeting 2006

Graspop Metal Meeting 2007

Graspop Metal Meeting 2008

Graspop Metal Meeting 2009

Graspop Metal Meeting 2010

Graspop Metal Meeting 2011

Graspop Metal Meeting 2012

Graspop Metal Meeting 2013

Graspop Metal Meeting 2014
Megadeth had to cancel their show. They used to be the headliner on Mainstage 2 on Sunday.

Graspop Metal Meeting 2015

Graspop Metal Meeting 2016

Graspop Metal Meeting 2017 

Dee Snider replaced W.A.S.P

Graspop Metal Meeting 2018 
In 2018 the Festival will have 4 full days and was completely sold out for the first time in its existence. 

(*) Replacing P.O.D.

Graspop Metal Meeting 2019

Graspop Metal Meeting 2020 (cancellation) 

In 2020 the festival planned to organise the 25th edition. Therefore they would have celebrated it as a full 4-day festival. Bands intended to perform included Iron Maiden, Judas Priest, Aerosmith, Mercyful Fate, Disturbed, Faith No More, Killing Joke, The Offspring, Korn, Airbourne and others. On 15 April 2020, the festival announced on its Facebook page that the 2020 edition would be cancelled because of the ongoing COVID-19 pandemic. The festival was rescheduled to 2021, and then again rescheduled to 2022 because of the ongoing pandemic in 2021.

Graspop Metal Meeting 2022

External links 

 Non official French website

References 

Heavy metal festivals in Belgium
Music festivals established in 1996
Summer events in Belgium